The 2006 NASCAR Busch Series opened on February 18, 2006, at Daytona International Speedway, and  concluded on November 18, 2006, at Homestead-Miami Speedway. Kevin Harvick, driving for his own team, Kevin Harvick, Inc., as well as for Richard Childress Racing, was declared champion.

This was the Final Season that Fox Sports/FX, TNT, and NBC covered the Busch Series. Starting in 2007, as part of a new TV contract with the television networks of The Walt Disney Company, ESPN2 televised the entire Busch season with select races on ABC.

Invasion of the "Busch Whackers"

There has been some controversy of the use of NEXTEL Cup teams with their drivers in Busch Series races, most notably at NEXTEL Cup tracks where there are Busch Series support races.  This has been dubbed by Fox Sports announcer Mike Joy as "Busch Whacking", and many underfunded (or one-car) teams have failed to qualify for these races because of this.  Out of the 35 races that were run in the 2006 Busch Series season, 33 of those races were won by NEXTEL Cup Series drivers.  The only 2 non-NEXTEL Cup Series drivers that won Busch Series races in 2006 were David Gilliland at Kentucky and Paul Menard at Milwaukee.  The 2006 season has been notable for those "double duty" drivers even traveling to sites where there are stand-alone races at Nashville Superspeedway, Kentucky Speedway, Autódromo Hermanos Rodriguez and The Milwaukee Mile just to name a few, even on the rare weeks where there are no NEXTEL Cup races.  Kentucky was the big upset where one of the underfunded one-car teams took advantage and pulled off the big upset.

In the end, Kevin Harvick, who at the time drove for Richard Childress Racing in the Cup series, won the 2006 championship on October 13, the second of his career having previously won in 2001.  After Harvick won the title, talk began about limiting the number of "Busch Whackers" (Cup drivers) in each race or capping the double-dippers appearances for the entire season or even having a "Chase for the NEXTEL Cup" playoff system in place for the 2007 season since Harvick was so dominant during 2006 as NEXTEL Cup drivers won every race but two in the season. Ultimately, no changes were made until 2011, where NASCAR announced that Cup drivers could only run for points in one series. A limit over the number of races Cup drivers could run was not put into effect until over a decade later in 2017. The Busch/Nationwide/Xfinity Series did not have a playoffs ("Chase") until 2016, ten years later.

Schedule

Teams and drivers

Complete schedule

Limited schedule

Notes

Races

Hershey's Kissables 300
The Hershey's Kissables 300 race was held on February 18, 2006, at Daytona International Speedway. J. J. Yeley won the pole.

Top ten results

 #33 Tony Stewart
 #77 Burney Lamar
 #2 Clint Bowyer
 #47 Jon Wood
 #29 Kevin Harvick
 #32 Jason Leffler
 #06 Todd Kluever
 #18 J. J. Yeley
 #41 Reed Sorenson
 #4 Mark Green

Failed to qualify: Kertus Davis (#0), Jay Sauter (#01), Kevin Lepage (#56), Chad Chaffin (#05), Larry Hollenbeck (#62), Chris Wimmer (#23).

Stater Brothers 300
On February 25, 2006, the Busch Series took to California Speedway for this 300-mile race. Carl Edwards was the polesitter. Matt Kenseth suffered a 25-point penalty for an unapproved adjustment found in his car during opening day inspection.

Top ten results

 #16 Greg Biffle
 #39 Ryan Newman
 #60 Carl Edwards
 #21 Jeff Burton
 #64 Jamie McMurray
 #17 Matt Kenseth
 #18 J. J. Yeley
 #33 Kevin Harvick
 #57 Brian Vickers
 #20 Denny Hamlin

Failed to qualify: Derrike Cope (#49), David Gilliland (#84), Chris Wimmer (#23).

Telcel-Motorola 200
This road-course race took place on March 5, 2006 at Autódromo Hermanos Rodriguez in Mexico City, Mexico. Boris Said won the pole.

Top ten results

 #20 Denny Hamlin
 #9 Boris Said
 #21 Kevin Harvick
 #18 J. J. Yeley
 #11 Paul Menard
 #00 Johnny Sauter
 #5 Kyle Busch
 #60 Carl Edwards
 #90 Marc Goossens
 #64 Jamie McMurray

This was Hamlin's first career Busch Series victory.
Failed to qualify: Eduardo Goeters (#49), Stan Silva Jr. (#65), and Chris Wimmer (#23).

Sam's Town 300
On March 11, 2006, the Busch Series raced at Las Vegas Motor Speedway. Matt Kenseth started from the pole position.

Top ten results
 #9 Kasey Kahne
 #17 Matt Kenseth
 #21 Kevin Harvick
 #16 Greg Biffle
 #60 Carl Edwards
 #20 Denny Hamlin
 #64 Jamie McMurray
 #18 J. J. Yeley
 #2 Clint Bowyer
 #41 Reed Sorenson

Failed to qualify: Jorge Goeters (#49), Kertus Davis (#0), Chris Wimmer (#23).

This race was the only NASCAR Busch Series race for Spencer Clark. He would pass away two months later.

Nicorette 300
The Nicorette 300 was held on March 18 at Atlanta Motor Speedway. Kyle Busch was the polesitter.

Top ten results
 #21 Jeff Burton
 #9 Kasey Kahne
 #16 Greg Biffle
 #17 Matt Kenseth
 #18 J. J. Yeley
 #32 Jason Leffler
 #57 Brian Vickers
 #77 Burney Lamar
 #64 Jamie McMurray
 #11 Paul Menard

Failed to qualify: Jorge Goeters (#49), Steadman Marlin (#95), Chris Wimmer (#23)

Sharpie Mini 300
This race was held on March 25 at Bristol Motor Speedway. Qualifying was snowed out and the field was set by current owner points. As a result, Kevin Harvick started from pole. The race was also halted by snow and drivers, crews, and fans amused themselves by throwing snowballs and building a snowman. The race was restarted after a 90-minute delay and run full-distance.

Top Ten results

 #5 Kyle Busch
 #21 Kevin Harvick
 #17 Matt Kenseth
 #20 Denny Hamlin
 #60 Carl Edwards
 #9 Scott Riggs
 #33 Ron Hornaday Jr.
 #22 Kenny Wallace
 #10 John Andretti
 #00 Johnny Sauter

Failed to qualify: Caleb Holman (#75), Brad Teague (#05), Jerry Robertson (#72), Shane Hall (#28)

O'Reilly 300
This race was held on April 8 at Texas Motor Speedway. Denny Hamlin won the pole, the first of his Busch series career. The race finished under a green-white-checker finish and was won by Kurt Busch in his first Busch Series start. Matt Kenseth suffered a 25-point penalty for an unapproved adjustment to his car found in post-race inspection.

Top ten results

 Kurt Busch (#39)
 Greg Biffle (#16)
 Casey Mears (#32)
 Kyle Busch (#5)
 Matt Kenseth (#17)
 Jeff Burton (#21)
 Paul Menard (#11)
 Kevin Harvick (#33)
 Scott Wimmer (#66)
 Denny Hamlin (#20)

Failed to qualify: Kertus Davis (#0), Jorge Goeters (#49), Chris Wimmer (#23)

Pepsi 300
This race was on held April 15 at Nashville Superspeedway. Denny Hamlin won his second pole in a row.

Top ten results
 Kevin Harvick (#21)
 Clint Bowyer (#2)
 Denny Hamlin (#20)
 J. J. Yeley (#18)
 Carl Edwards (#60)
 Jon Wood (#47)
 Burney Lamar (#77)
 Kenny Wallace (#22)
 Paul Menard (#11)
 Michael Waltrip (#99)

Failed to qualify: Jason White (#08)

Bashas' Supermarkets 200
This race was held April 21 at Phoenix International Raceway. Jason Leffler won the pole. The race finished under a green-white-checker finish as Kevin Harvick won his second race in a row.

Top ten results:

 Kevin Harvick (#21)
 Reed Sorenson (#41)
 Carl Edwards (#60)
 Kurt Busch (#39)
 Mark Martin (#6)
 Matt Kenseth (#17)
 Greg Biffle (#16)
 David Green (#27)
 Casey Mears (#42)
 Jamie McMurray (#64)

Failed to qualify: Jay Sauter (#01), Marc Mitchell (#23), Jorge Goeters (#49), Chris Cook (#56)

Aaron's 312
This race was held April 29 at Talladega Superspeedway. J. J. Yeley won the pole. Kevin Harvick, Burney Lamar, who finished 20th, and Tony Stewart, who finished 39th, all suffered 25 point penalties for unapproved adjustments to their cars.

Top ten results
 Martin Truex Jr. (#8)
 Kevin Harvick (#21)
 Kyle Busch (#5)
 Brian Vickers (#57)
 Clint Bowyer (#2)
 Greg Biffle (#16)
 Mark McFarland (#88)
 Johnny Sauter (#00)
 Paul Menard (#11)
 Carl Edwards (#60)

As there were the maximum of forty-three cars to race, there were no drivers or teams that failed to qualify.
Tony Stewart flipped during the race when Stewart was turned by Kenny Wallace.

Circuit City 250
This race was held May 5 and May 6 at Richmond International Raceway. Jason Leffler won the pole. The race start was delayed approximately 1 hour for rain, after 13 laps rain fell again and the race was stopped for approximately another 43 minutes. The race eventually finished after midnight local time, resulting in the race occurring over two days. Kevin Harvick won his third Busch race of the year.

Top ten results
 #21 Kevin Harvick
 #29 Jeff Burton
 #17 Matt Kenseth
 #16 Greg Biffle
 #39 Ryan Newman
 #60 Carl Edwards
 #2 Clint Bowyer
 #11 Paul Menard
 #5 Kyle Busch
 #20 Denny Hamlin

Failed to qualify: Jason Keller (#34), Jorge Goeters (#28), Shane Hall (#49), Kevin Conway (#40), Joel Kauffman (#12), Kertus Davis (#0), A. J. Foyt IV (#14)

Diamond Hill Plywood 200
This race was held May 12 at Darlington Raceway. Denny Hamlin won from the pole.

 #20 Denny Hamlin
 #17 Matt Kenseth
 #64 Jamie McMurray
 #6 Mark Martin
 #16 Greg Biffle
 #5 Kyle Busch
 #21 Kevin Harvick
 #60 Carl Edwards
 #18 J. J. Yeley
 #38 Jason Leffler

Failed to qualify: Derrike Cope (#49), Morgan Shepherd (#0), Shane Hall (#28)

Carquest Auto Parts 300
This race was held May 27 at Lowe's Motor Speedway. Matt Kenseth won the pole.

Top ten results

 #60 Carl Edwards
 #39 Kurt Busch
 #18 J. J. Yeley
 #42 Casey Mears
 #8  Martin Truex Jr.
 #29 Jeff Burton
 #48 Jimmie Johnson
 #21 Kevin Harvick
 #06 Todd Kluever
 #35 Regan Smith

Failed to qualify: Aaron Fike (#43), David Gilliland (#84), Stanton Barrett (#72), Joel Kauffman (#12), Eric McClure (#04), Kertus Davis (#34), Kevin Conway (#40)

Stonebridgeracing.com 200
This race was held June 3 at Dover International Speedway.  Qualifying was rained out, and the field was set by the rulebook, with the top 30 teams taking the first fifteen rows.  Because of that, Kevin Harvick was awarded the pole position.

Top ten results:

 #29 Jeff Burton
 #60 Carl Edwards
 #39 Kurt Busch
 #2 Clint Bowyer
 #33 Ron Hornaday Jr.
 #5 Kyle Busch
 #20 Denny Hamlin
 #16 Greg Biffle
 #18 J. J. Yeley
 #41 Reed Sorenson

As there were the maximum of forty-three cars needed to race, no drivers or teams failed to qualify.

Federated Auto Parts 300
This race was held June 10 at Nashville Superspeedway. Todd Kluever won the pole.

top ten results

 #60 Carl Edwards
 #2 Clint Bowyer
 #21 Kevin Harvick
 #20 Denny Hamlin
 #11 Paul Menard
 #99 David Reutimann
 #66 Greg Biffle
 #47 Jon Wood
 #25 Ashton Lewis
 #50 Danny O'Quinn Jr.

Failed to qualify: Jerry Robertson (#78), John Hayden (#85)

Meijer 300
This race was held June 17 at Kentucky Speedway. Denny Hamlin won the pole. In a stunning upset, David Gilliland became the first winner in the 2006 season that was not on a team with a Nextel Cup driver. Jeff Fuller was involved in a severe crash where, trying to avoid the spinning car of Jason Leffler, Fuller hit the inside wall at full speed, and the car practically imploded on impact. Fuller suffered a broken wrist and thumb.

Top ten results:
 #84 David Gilliland
 #18 J. J. Yeley
 #20 Denny Hamlin
 #1 Mike Wallace
 #25 Ashton Lewis
 #21 Kevin Harvick
 #66 Greg Biffle
 #99 David Reutimann
 #11 Paul Menard
 #90 Stephen Leicht

Failed to qualify: John Hayden (#85), David Odell (#07), Stan Boyd (#23)

AT&T 250
This race was held June 24 at The Milwaukee Mile. Aric Almirola won the pole in the car normally driven by Denny Hamlin who actually drove the race in the car and started from the back. As a result, Paul Menard started the race from the pole position. He then went on to capture his first Busch series victory. This race was strange for the fact that only 41 cars started the race, instead of the usual 43.

Top ten results

 #11 Paul Menard
 #20 Denny Hamlin
 #18 J. J. Yeley
 #38 Jason Leffler
 #1 Mike Wallace
 #59 Stacy Compton
 #50 Danny O'Quinn Jr.
 #22 Kenny Wallace
 #00 Johnny Sauter
 #99 David Reutimann

Failed to qualify: none

Winn-Dixie 250
The Winn-Dixie 250 was held June 30 at Daytona International Speedway. J. J. Yeley won the pole. Kevin Harvick and Burney Lamar, who finished 22nd, suffered 50 point penalties for unapproved adjustments found on their cars during post-race inspection. This was the final race to be broadcast on FOX until the 2015 Alert Florida 300.

Top ten results:
 #8 Dale Earnhardt Jr.
 #57 Brian Vickers
 #21 Kevin Harvick
 #18 J. J. Yeley
 #60 Carl Edwards
 #2 Clint Bowyer
 #1 Mike Wallace
 #88 Martin Truex Jr.
 #16 Greg Biffle
 #10 John Andretti

As there were the maximum of forty-three cars needed to race, no drivers or teams failed to qualify.

USG Durock 300
This race was held on July 8 at Chicagoland Speedway. Carl Edwards won the pole. Casey Mears captured his first NASCAR victory using an alternate fuel strategy.

Top ten results
 #42 Casey Mears
 #60 Carl Edwards
 #29 Jeff Burton
 #21 Kevin Harvick
 #17 Matt Kenseth
 #39 Kurt Busch
 #2 Clint Bowyer
 #41 Reed Sorenson
 #33 Tony Stewart
 #18 J. J. Yeley

Failed to qualify: Derrike Cope (#49), Justin Diercks (#70), Carl Long (#23)

New England 200
The New England 200 was held July 15 at New Hampshire International Speedway. Kyle Busch won the pole. Clint Bowyer dominated early in the race but Carl Edwards captured the victory.

Top ten results:
 #60 Carl Edwards
 #21 Kevin Harvick
 #20 Denny Hamlin
 #11 Paul Menard
 #2 Clint Bowyer
 #00 Johnny Sauter
 #9 Scott Riggs
 #18 J. J. Yeley
 #66 Scott Wimmer
 #16 Greg Biffle

As there were the maximum of forty-three cars needed to race, no drivers or teams failed to qualify.

Goody's 250
The Goody's 250 was held July 22 at Martinsville Speedway. Clint Bowyer won the pole.

Top ten results

 #21 Kevin Harvick
 #2 Clint Bowyer
 #20 Denny Hamlin
 #41 Reed Sorenson
 #00 Johnny Sauter
 #60 Carl Edwards
 #10 John Andretti
 #38 Jason Leffler
 #18 J. J. Yeley
 #01 Jay Sauter

Failed to qualify: Richard Landreth (#89)

 Final career NASCAR start for Darrell Waltrip and Ricky Craven.

Busch Silver Celebration 250
The Busch Silver Celebration 250 was held July 29 at Gateway International Raceway. Denny Hamlin won the pole. Tim Sauter, who finished 22nd, suffered a 50-point penalty for illegal shocks found on his car during post-race inspection.

Top ten results

 #60 Carl Edwards
 #2 Clint Bowyer
 #20 Denny Hamlin
 #41 Reed Sorenson
 #21 Kevin Harvick
 #66 Scott Wimmer
 #27 David Green
 #5 Kyle Busch
 #22 Kenny Wallace
 #56 Kevin Grubb

Failed to qualify: Brad Teague (#05), Shane Hall (#49), Kevin Hamlin (#12)

Kroger 200
The Kroger 200 was held August 5 at O'Reilly Raceway Park. Denny Hamlin won his second pole in a row for the second time in 2006.

Top ten results

 #21 Kevin Harvick
 #41 Reed Sorenson
 #18 J. J. Yeley
 #16 Greg Biffle
 #29 Jeff Burton
 #50 Danny O'Quinn Jr.
 #01 Jay Sauter
 #20 Denny Hamlin
 #11 Paul Menard
 #60 Carl Edwards

Failed to qualify: Todd Shafer (#28)

Zippo 200
This race was held August 12 at Watkins Glen International. Kurt Busch won the race from the pole. Kurt Busch and Robby Gordon cut off track several times to duel on the final lap.

Top ten results: 202.45 miles/83 laps due to green-white-checkered rule.
 #39 Kurt Busch
 #7 Robby Gordon
 #64 Jamie McMurray
 #66 Greg Biffle
 #10 John Andretti
 #88 Martin Truex Jr.
 #21 Kevin Harvick
 #9 Boris Said
 #33 Ron Fellows
 #1 Scott Pruett

Failed to qualify: Stan Silva Jr. (#65), Eduardo Troconis (#23), John Finger (#49)

Carfax 250
This race was held August 19 at Michigan International Speedway. Mark Martin won the pole.

Top ten results: 128 laps/256 miles due to green-white-checkered rule.

 #8 Dale Earnhardt Jr.
 #42 Casey Mears
 #88 Robby Gordon
 #17 Matt Kenseth
 #6 Mark Martin
 #20 Denny Hamlin
 #41 Reed Sorenson
 #21 Kevin Harvick
 #18 J. J. Yeley
 #29 Jeff Burton

Failed to qualify: Dexter Bean (#49)

Final Busch Series win for DEI.

Food City 250
This race was held August 25 at Bristol Motor Speedway. Ryan Newman won the pole.

Top ten results:

 #17 Matt Kenseth
 #21 Kevin Harvick
 #33 Ron Hornaday Jr.
 #9  Kasey Kahne
 #38 Jason Leffler
 #39 Ryan Newman
 #5  Kyle Busch
 #60 Carl Edwards
 #99 David Reutimann
 #11 Paul Menard

Failed to qualify: Carl Long (#89), Caleb Holman (#75), D. J. Kennington (#72), Brad Keselowski (#23)

Final Busch Series Race for Pontiac.

Ameriquest 300
This race was held September 2 at California Speedway. Clint Bowyer won the pole. Brad Keselowski made his NASCAR debut in this race.

Top ten results:

 #9 Kasey Kahne
 #21 Kevin Harvick
 #6 Mark Martin
 #11 Paul Menard
 #25 Ashton Lewis
 #33 Tony Stewart
 #17 Matt Kenseth
 #47 Jon Wood
 #88 Robby Gordon
 #01 Jay Sauter

Failed to qualify: Derrike Cope (#49)

Emerson Radio 250
This race was held September 8 at Richmond International Raceway. Jeff Burton won the pole.

Top ten results:

 #21 Kevin Harvick
 #16 Greg Biffle
 #17 Matt Kenseth
 #11 Paul Menard
 #41 Reed Sorenson
 #20 Denny Hamlin
 #32 Dave Blaney
 #66 Scott Wimmer
 #60 Carl Edwards
 #9 Scott Riggs

Failed to qualify: Chris Cook (#43), Hermie Sadler (#28), Justin Diercks (#70), Josh Krug (#37), Shane Hall (#49)

Dover 200
This race was held September 23 at Dover International Speedway. Scott Riggs won the pole. Clint Bowyer held off Matt Kenseth in a green-white-checker finish.

Top ten results:
 #2 Clint Bowyer
 #17 Matt Kenseth
 #21 Kevin Harvick
 #64 Jamie McMurray
 #38 Jason Leffler
 #41 Reed Sorenson
 #5 Kyle Busch
 #16 Greg Biffle
 #18 J. J. Yeley
 #99 Michael Waltrip

As there were the maximum of forty-three cars needed to race, no drivers or teams failed to qualify.

Yellow Transportation 300
The Yellow Transportation 300 was held September 30 at Kansas Speedway. Matt Kenseth won the pole.

Top ten results:
 #21 Kevin Harvick
 #17 Matt Kenseth
 #5 Kyle Busch
 #33 Tony Stewart
 #2 Clint Bowyer
 #60 Carl Edwards
 #41 Reed Sorenson
 #16 Greg Biffle
 #77 Bobby Labonte
 #11 Paul Menard

Failed to qualify: Randy LaJoie (#37), Steadman Marlin (#95)

Dollar General 300
This race was held October 13 at Lowe's Motor Speedway. Carl Edwards started from the pole. Dave Blaney would earn his first career Busch Series win, and Kevin Harvick, despite failing to finish on the lead lap for the only time in the 2006 season, clinched the Busch Series Championship following a wreck involving second-place driver Carl Edwards and Casey Mears on lap 199 (at the start-finish line from lap 198 to lap 199) of a scheduled 200-lap race.

Top ten results: 203 laps/304.5 miles due to the green-white-checker rule

 #32 Dave Blaney
 #99 Michael Waltrip
 #59 Stacy Compton
 #17 Matt Kenseth
 #50 Danny O'Quinn Jr.
 #00 Johnny Sauter
 #2 Clint Bowyer
 #20 Denny Hamlin
 #33 Kevin Harvick
 #25 Ashton Lewis

Failed to qualify: Tim Sauter (#36), Kertus Davis (#0), Robert Richardson Jr. (#80), Eric McClure (#04), Derrike Cope (#49)

Sam's Town 250
This race was held October 28 at Memphis Motorsports Park. Johnny Sauter won the pole. Juan Pablo Montoya made his NASCAR debut in this race.

Top ten results:

 #21 Kevin Harvick
 #2 Clint Bowyer
 #60 Carl Edwards
 #00 Johnny Sauter
 #88 Shane Huffman
 #20 Denny Hamlin
 #41 Reed Sorenson
 #50 Danny O'Quinn Jr.
 #9 Kasey Kahne
 #18 J. J. Yeley

Failed to qualify: Ron Young (#71), Stanton Barrett (#95), Chris Wimmer (#0), Shane Hall (#49), Richard Landreth (#89), Chuck Barnes Jr. (#07)

O'Reilly Challenge
This race was held on November 4 at Texas Motor Speedway. Mark Martin won the pole.

Top ten results:
 #21 Kevin Harvick
 #19 Tony Stewart
 #29 Jeff Burton
 #6 Mark Martin
 #33 Ron Hornaday Jr.
 #18 J. J. Yeley
 #60 Carl Edwards
 #20 Denny Hamlin
 #77 Bobby Labonte
 #06 Todd Kluever

Failed to qualify: Justin Diercks (#70), Robert Richardson Jr. (#80), Jerry Robertson (#78), Derrike Cope (#49), Jorge Goeters (#63)

Arizona.Travel 200
The Arizona.Travel 200 was held November 11 at Phoenix International Raceway. Sam Hornish Jr., the 2006 IRL champion, made his NASCAR debut here. Matt Kenseth won race from the pole.

Top ten results: 203 miles/203 laps due to green-white-checkered rule.

 #17 Matt Kenseth
 #21 Kevin Harvick
 #20 Denny Hamlin
 #2 Clint Bowyer
 #60 Carl Edwards
 #18 J. J. Yeley
 #41 Reed Sorenson
 #88 Shane Huffman
 #33 Ron Hornaday Jr.
 #5 Kyle Busch

Failed to qualify: Mike Skinner (#12), D. J. Kennington (#72), Shane Hall (#49), Josh Krug (#37)

Ford 300
The Ford 300 was held November 18 at Homestead-Miami Speedway. Kevin Harvick won the pole.

Top ten results:

 #17 Matt Kenseth
 #60 Carl Edwards
 #11 Paul Menard
 #20 Denny Hamlin
 #18 J. J. Yeley
 #21 Kevin Harvick
 #8 Dale Earnhardt Jr.
 #9 Kasey Kahne
 #06 Todd Kluever
 #00 Johnny Sauter

Failed to qualify: Robert Richardson Jr. (#80), Justin Diercks (#70), D. J. Kennington (#72), Kertus Davis (#0), Kraig Kinser (#04), Dawayne Bryan (#68), Morgan Shepherd (#49), Trevor Boys (#08), Brett Rowe (#05)

Final standings

Drivers 
The top 10

Full Drivers' Championship
(key) Bold – Pole position awarded by time. Italics – Pole position set by owner's points. * – Most laps led.

Declaring for points in one series: Rules change for 2011
This was the fifth-to-last season where Cup Series drivers could run for points in another series. NASCAR implemented this change after Cup drivers were winning the Busch/Nationwide championships over the series regulars for 5 years straight (2006-2010). If the change had been implemented for the 2006 season, Menard would have been the champion. The rest of the top 10 in the standings would have been Johnny Sauter in 2nd, Kenny Wallace (who finished 11th in points), John Andretti (12th), Jason Leffler (13th), Jon Wood (14th), Ashton Lewis (15th), Stacy Compton (16th), Todd Kluever (17th), and Danny O'Quinn Jr. (19th).

Rookies
 A. J. Foyt IV – Released midseason from the #38 Great Clips team after team switched from Dodge to Chevrolet (Foyt IV is under contract to Dodge Motorsports and could not break the contract)
 Joel Kauffman – Fired midseason from the #12 SuperCuts Dodge
 Todd Kluever – #06 3M Ford
 Mark McFarland – Fired midseason from the #88 United States Navy Chevrolet
 Burney Lamar – Fired midseason from the #77 Dollar General Chevrolet
 Danny O’Quinn Jr. – #50 World Financial Group Ford
 Chris Wimmer

Also, John Andretti was officially considered a Busch Series rookie of the year contender for 2006, even though he is a Winston/Nextel Cup veteran.

ROTY favorite Lamar was released early from his ride at KHI while leading the standings. Eventually, the ROTY came down to a fight between NEXTEL Cup veteran John Andretti and former USAR Pro Cup driver Danny O'Quinn Jr. Eventually, O'Quinn Jr., despite being pulled from his ride for two races in favor of David Ragan to prepare him for his full time Cup season in 2007, still managed to hold off Andretti to win the award by only a single point. Another preseason favorite and 2005 NCTS Rookie of the Year, Tood Kluever, struggled in his transition to the Busch Series. Another USAR driver, Mark McFarland, had an up and down year and was replaced by Shane Huffman. Joel Kauffman and Chris Wimmer made bids for ROTY, but were released from their rides. A. J. Foyt IV, in his transition to stock cars, was released due to a Dodge development deal.

See also
2006 NASCAR Nextel Cup Series
2006 NASCAR Craftsman Truck Series

NASCAR Xfinity Series seasons